George Sturgis Pillsbury (July 17, 1921 – October 13, 2012) was an American businessman and politician. His family was the founders and owners of the Pillsbury Company.

Life
Pillsbury was born in Crystal Bay, Orono, Minnesota. He went to The Blake School in Hopkins, Minnesota, and to St. Paul's School in Concord, New Hampshire. In 1942, he graduated from Yale University. Pillsbury served in the United States Marine Corps during World War II. He worked for the Pillsbury Company and lived in Wayzata, Minnesota. Pillsbury was also involved in the banking, railroad, and clothing businesses. Pillsbury served on the Orono School Board and was a Republican. Pillsbury served in the Minnesota Senate from 1971 to 1982. His grandfather Charles Alfred Pillsbury also served in the Minnesota Legislature. He died at his home on Lake Minnetonka in Orono, Minnesota.

References

1921 births
2012 deaths
People from Orono, Minnesota
People from Wayzata, Minnesota
Military personnel from Minnesota
St. Paul's School (New Hampshire) alumni
Yale University alumni
Businesspeople from Minnesota
General Mills people
Pillsbury family
School board members in Minnesota
Republican Party Minnesota state senators
20th-century American businesspeople
United States Marine Corps personnel of World War II